Michael "Mike" Denis Young  is an Australian economist and water policy expert. He is best known for his work informing the management of the water resources of the Murray-Darling Basin. In 2006 he was listed by The Canberra Times as one of the ten most influential people in water policy reform. In 2009 Young became the inaugural director of the Environment Institute at the University of Adelaide. He holds a Research Chair in Water Economics and Management there and has been a member of the Wentworth Group of Concerned Scientists since 2002. In 2013-14, Young held the Gough Whitlam and Malcolm Fraser Chair of Australian Studies at Harvard University.

Early career 
Prior to joining the University of Adelaide, Young worked for the CSIRO for thirty years. During this time, he established their Policy and Economic Research Unit with offices in Adelaide, Canberra and Perth.

Nuclear waste 
Mike Young is interested in exploring the idea that there may be a role for the development of a nuclear waste storage industry in Australia. 

In 2015/16, he chaired the South Australian Royal Commission into the Nuclear Cycle's Social and Economic Modelling and Assessment Committee.

Honours 
Young received a Centenary Medal for "outstanding service through environmental economics" in 2001. In 2005, The Canberra Times recognised Young as "Green Australian of the Year." In 2008, Young was awarded South Australian of the Year in the Environment category. He was elected fellow of the Academy of Social Sciences in Australia in 1998 and is a Distinguished Fellow of the Australian Agricultural and Resource Economics Society.

References 

Living people
Australian economists
Place of birth missing (living people)
Year of birth missing (living people)
CSIRO people
Fellows of the Academy of the Social Sciences in Australia
Academic staff of the University of Adelaide